Balaka macrocarpa is a species of flowering plant in the family Arecaceae. It is found only in Fiji. It is threatened by habitat loss.

References

macrocarpa
Endemic flora of Fiji
Critically endangered plants
Taxonomy articles created by Polbot
Plants described in 1935
Taxa named by Max Burret